The Vidya Jyothi is a Sri Lankan national honour awarded "for outstanding scientific and technological achievements". It is the highest national honour for science in Sri Lanka for outstanding contribution to the development of the country through dedicated work in the chosen field. It is conventionally used as a title or prefix to the awardee's name.

Vidya Jyothi ranks lower than Veera Chudamani.

Awardees
Awardees include:

1986
 Geoffrey Manning Bawa
 Arthur Charles Clarke
 Suntheralingam Gnanalingam
 Arumadura Nandasena Silva Kulasinghe
 Arumugam Wisvalingam Mailvaganam
 Christopher Rajindra Panabokke
 E.O. Eustace Pereira

1987
 Gamini Lakshman Peiris

1988
 Phillip Reyvatha Wijewardene
 Kanapathypillai Yoheswaran
 Nandrani Swarnamitta de Zoysa

1989
 Ratna Sabapathy Cooke

1990
 Cyril Andrew Ponnamperuma
 Kotti Rambukkana Mahawahalla Anthony Don Michael
 Mohamed Uvais Siddeek Sultanbawa

1991
 Hapugoda Rankotge Premaratne
 Raja Hemapala de Silva

1992
 Beatrice Vivienne de Mel
 Kudatelge Rubert Shelton Peiris
 Sembukuttiarachchilage Roland Silva
 Nalin Chandra Wickramasinghe

1993
 Karannagoda Kankanamalage Yasaratne Wijayasundara Perera
 Herathmudiyanselage Herbert Ratnayake Samarasinghe
 Rezvi Sheriff
 Welapura Naidelage Gemunu Silva

1994
 Shelton  Aloysius Cabraal
 Cecil Ashley de Vos
 Stella Gertrude de Silva

1998
 D. P. Anura Fernando
 C. B. Dissanayake
 M. A. Careem
 J. B. Peiris
 Diyanath Samarasinghe
 Senaka Dias Bandaranayake
 Arjuna Aluwihare
 V. K. Samaranayake
 R. O. Barnes Wijesekera

2005
 A. D. S. Gunawardena
 Colvin Gunaratne
 Damian Nobert Lakshman Alwis
 Damitha Ramanayake
 Dayantha Sepala Wijesekera
 E. W. Marasinghe
 Eric H. Karunanayake
 Janaka de Silva
 Lalitha Mendis
 Mohan Jayatilake
 S. Mahalingam
 S. Mohanadas
 Wijaya Godakumbura

2017 
 Alagiyawanna Mohotti Appuhamillage Nimal Kitsiri Senanayake
 Bandula Wijayarathna
 Colvin Ananda Samarasinghe
 Delpechitracharige Gajabahu Harendra de Silva
 De Silva T. K. Nimal Padmasena
 Errol Radcliffe Jansz
 Lal Gotabhaya Chandrasena
 Mahamendige Wilfred Joseph Gerard Mendis
 Moderage Marian Rohan Waas Jayasekara
 Sarath Wimalabandara Kotagama
 Upali Tissa Vitarana

2018 
 Arjuna de Silva
  Don Dilshan Abeywardane
 Bandula Wijesiriwardena
 Asita de Silva
 Prasad Katulanda
 Vajira Dissanayake
 Mandika Wijeyaratne

References

External links

 
Civil awards and decorations of Sri Lanka